Muhammad Bilal Khan was a Justice in the Lahore High Court in Pakistan.

Career

Khan was a practicing lawyer before the Supreme Court of Pakistan  and the Lahore High Court. He has also served as an additional Advocate General of Punjab for almost four years.

Khan was appointed to the Lahore High Court on September 3, 2003, and remained in that position until March 6, 2009. On March 7, 2008, President Asif Ali Zardari of Pakistan appointed him as second Chief Justice of the Islamabad High Court, succeeding Sardar Muhammad Aslam.

On July 31, 2009, a 14-person panel of the Supreme Court of Pakistan declared the creation of the Islamabad High Court to be unconstitutional. Khan returned to be a Justice of Lahore High Court. Since he took oath on PCO 2007 (see below), in contravention of a decision of a 7-person panel of the Supreme Court, he was referred to the Supreme Judicial Council of Pakistan.

Controversies

PCO Oath

On November 3, 2007, the Chief of Staff of the Pakistani Army declared a state of emergency and issued a Provisional Constitutional Order (PCO). A 7-person panel of the Supreme Court issued an order declaring the state of emergency illegal and prohibiting all judges from taking oath on any PCO. Justice Khan was a sitting judge in Lahore High Court and choose to take the oath on November 3, 2007. Others of the 31 judges who took oath with him were Syed Zahid Hussain Bokhari, Nasim Sikandar, Khalid Alvi, Sakhi Hussain Bokhari, Muzammal Khan, Fazal-e-Miran Chohan, Syed Shabbar Raza Rizvi, Hamid Ali Shah, Tariq Shamim, Syed Asghar Haider, Hasnaat Ahmad Khan and Lahore High Court Chief Justice Iftikhar Hussain Chaudhry.

On July 31, 2009, a 14-person panel of the Supreme Court held that the PCO of November 3, 2007, was illegal. On November 2, 2007, they referred the cases of all judges who were members of the higher judiciary to the Supreme Judicial Council.

Land Allotment

According to a list presented to the National Assembly of Pakistan by the Federal Government Employees Foundation through the then-Housing Minister Syed Safwanullah on April 27, 2007, Khan is one of the 61 high court judges who were allotted plots in Sector G-14 of Islamabad.

Disqualification of Nawaz Sharif

On June 22, 2008, a three-member Lahore High Court bench composed of Justice M. Bilal Khan, Justice Abdul Shakoor Paracha and Justice Syed Shabbar Raza Rizvi, handed down a unanimous decision that disqualified Nawaz Sharif from contesting a by-election. The Court last ruled that Sharif was not eligible to run in the upcoming parliamentary by-elections because he has been convicted of a crime. The Sharif brothers had refused to appear before the court and defend themselves, declaring that they did not recognize the justices' authority and labeling them "PCO Judges".

Relations with underground 

In the judicial system of Pakistan, the Supreme Judicial Council is mandated to check misconduct, moral degradation and corruption in the higher echelons of the judiciary. For the first time in the country’s history, the Supreme Judicial Council has initiated suo motu proceedings against Khan over allegations of involvement in murky activities, including connections with the crime underworld.

References

External links
 Lahore High Court
 Official Site of Islamabad High Court

Chief Justices of the Islamabad High Court
Judges of the Lahore High Court
Living people
1949 births
People from Islamabad